Connor David Shanks (born 11 April 2002) is an English professional footballer who plays as a midfielder for National League North club Spennymoor Town.

Career
Born in Halifax, West Yorkshire, Shanks began his career with Huddersfield Town, joining Bradford City in 2017. He was named in the League Football Education's 'The 11' list in June 2020. He turned professional in July 2020, signing a one-year contract.

He made his senior debut for Bradford City on 8 September 2020, in the EFL Trophy.

On 12 May 2021 he was one of nine players that Bradford City announced would leave the club on 30 June 2021 when their contracts expire.

He signed for Huddersfield Town in August 2021, moving on loan to Nuneaton Borough in September 2021. On 24 March 2022, Shanks joined National League North side Boston United on a youth loan for the remainder of the 2021–22 season.

On 19 January 2023, Shanks' contract at Huddersfield was terminated in order to allow him to pursue other opportunities. He joined National League North club Spennymoor Town two days later.

Career statistics

References

2002 births
Living people
English footballers
Association football midfielders
Huddersfield Town A.F.C. players
Bradford City A.F.C. players
Nuneaton Borough F.C. players
Boston United F.C. players
Spennymoor Town F.C. players
Southern Football League players